The 2009 World Taekwondo Championships are the 19th edition of the World Taekwondo Championships, and were held at Ballerup Super Arena in Copenhagen, Denmark from October 14 to October 18, 2009.

Medal table

Medal summary

Men

Women

Team ranking
China grabbed the women's overall title, It marked the first time that Korea failed to retain the women's overall title in the history of the biennial World Taekwondo Championships.

Men

Women

Participating nations 
928 athletes from 142 nations competed.

 (7)
 (11)
 (2)
 (2)
 (6)
 (4)
 (3)
 (15)
 (5)
 (12)
 (2)
 (2)
 (7)
 (6)
 (1)
 (2)
 (2)
 (2)
 (6)
 (16)
 (4)
 (2)
 (2)
 (5)
 (16)
 (2)
 (3)
 (9)
 (16)
 (16)
 (15)
 (6)
 (4)
 (12)
 (10)
 (14)
 (7)
 (13)
 (13)
 (5)
 (10)
 (2)
 (3)
 (3)
 (16)
 (3)
 (1)
 (12)
 (4)
 (10)
 (15)
 (2)
 (5)
 (2)
 (3)
 (4)
 (8)
 (8)
 (3)
 (8)
 (2)
 (13)
 (5)
 (5)
 (8)
 (13)
 (12)
 (5)
 (11)
 (15)
 (11)
 (6)
 (2)
 (3)
 (2)
 (10)
 (3)
 (1)
 (7)
 (4)
 (2)
 (2)
 (4)
 (7)
 (1)
 (16)
 (2)
 (2)
 (1)
 (12)
 (2)
 (3)
 (6)
 (3)
 (9)
 (2)
 (6)
 (8)
 (1)
 (5)
 (2)
 (2)
 (3)
 (12)
 (6)
 (3)
 (14)
 (4)
 (4)
 (16)
 (3)
 (8)
 (12)
 (4)
 (1)
 (7)
 (3)
 (16)
 (16)
 (2)
 (1)
 (5)
 (13)
 (3)
 (2)
 (8)
 (8)
 (2)
 (5)
 (3)
 (16)
 (2)
 (16)
 (11)
 (2)
 (11)
 (2)
 (16)
 (15)
 (2)
 (2)
 (3)

References
General
 Official Report
Specific

External links
 Official website
 TKD club participated

 
World Championships
World Taekwondo Championships
World Taekwondo Championships
International sports competitions in Copenhagen
Taekwondo competitions in Denmark